A Farmer's Year: Being His Commonplace Book for 1898 is a non-fiction book by H Rider Haggard.

It was written as a serial for Longman's Magazine.

References

External links
Complete book at Internet Archive

1899 non-fiction books
Works by H. Rider Haggard
Literature first published in serial form
Works originally published in Longman's Magazine